The Russia–Georgia Friendship Monument or Treaty of Georgievsk Monument is a monument built in 1983 to celebrate the bicentennial of the Treaty of Georgievsk and the ongoing friendship between Soviet Georgia and Soviet Russia. Located on the Georgian Military Highway between the ski resort town of Gudauri and the Jvari pass, the monument is a large round stone and concrete structure overlooking the Devil's Valley in the Caucasus mountains. Inside the monument is a large tile mural that spans the whole circumference of the structure and depicts scenes of Georgian and Russian history.

Gallery

External links 

Monuments and memorials in Georgia (country)
Buildings and structures in Mtskheta-Mtianeti
Tourist attractions in Mtskheta-Mtianeti
Buildings and structures completed in 1983